The chief of space operations (CSO) is the service chief of the United States Space Force. The CSO is the principal military adviser to the secretary of the Air Force for Space Force operations and, as a member of the Joint Chiefs of Staff, a military adviser to the National Security Council, the secretary of defense, and the president. The CSO is a statutory office held by a Space Force general, who is typically the highest-ranking officer on active duty in the Space Force.

The CSO is an administrative position based in the Pentagon, and while they do not have operational command authority over Space Force forces, the chief of space operations does exercise supervision of Space Force units and organizations as the designee of the secretary of the Air Force.

Appointment, rank, and responsibilities

Appointment 
The chief of space operations is nominated for appointment by the president, for a four-year term of office, and must be confirmed by the Senate. The chief can be reappointed to serve one additional term, but only during times of war or national emergency declared by Congress. By statute, the chief is appointed as a four-star general.

Responsibilities

Department of the Air Force 
Under the authority, direction and control of the secretary of the Air Force, the chief of space operations presides over the Space Staff, acts as the secretary's executive agent in carrying out approved plans, and exercises supervision over organizations and members of the Space Force as determined by the secretary. The chief of space operations may also perform other duties as assigned by either the president, the secretary of defense or the secretary of the Air Force.

Member of the Joint Chiefs of Staff 
The chief of space operations became a statutory member of the Joint Chiefs of Staff on 20 December 2020. When performing duties as a member of the Joint Chiefs, the chief of space operations is responsible directly to the secretary of defense. Like the other members of the Joint Chiefs of Staff, the CSO is an administrative position, with no operational command authority over Space Force forces.

History 

The post of chief of space operations was created on 20 December 2019, along with the United States Space Force, with the signing of the National Defense Authorization Act for Fiscal Year 2020. General John W. Raymond, the commander of US Space Command and Air Force Space Command, was announced as the first chief of space operations on that same day. On 14 January 2020, Raymond was sworn in as the first chief of space operations by Vice President Mike Pence.

On 20 December 2020, the CSO officially became the 8th member of the Joint Chiefs of Staff. Raymond was inducted to the body in a ceremony on 11 December 2020.

Space Staff 

The Office of the Chief of Space Operations, or more commonly referred to as the Space Staff, is the headquarters for the Space Force. It is responsible for organizing, training, and equipping of the Space Force cooperating with the Air Staff on support issues. It is headed by the chief of space operations and the vice chief of space operations, both four-star generals, and the chief master sergeant of the Space Force. There is also a director of staff who oversees the staff action group, protocol, information technology and administration, resources, and total force integration groups. The chief of space operations also has four deputy chiefs of space operations.

List of chiefs of space operations

Timeline

See also 
 Joint Chiefs of Staff
 Vice Chief of Space Operations
 Chief of Staff of the Air Force

References

Notes

Sources 

United States Space Force
US